Jerome Wilfred Engele (born November 26, 1950) is a Canadian retired professional ice hockey defenceman who scored 2 goals and played 100 games in the National Hockey League for the Minnesota North Stars between 1975 and 1978. He was the head coach of the Saskatoon Blades from 1979 to 1980.

Career statistics

Regular season and playoffs

External links
 

1950 births
Living people
Canadian ice hockey coaches
Canadian ice hockey defencemen
Fort Worth Texans players
Greensboro Generals (EHL) players
Ice hockey people from Saskatchewan
Minnesota North Stars players
New Haven Nighthawks players
Nova Scotia Voyageurs players
Saginaw Gears players
Saskatoon Blades coaches
Saskatoon Blades players
Suncoast Suns (EHL) players
Undrafted National Hockey League players